"That's What I Get for Losin' You" is a song co-written and recorded by American country music artist Hal Ketchum.  It was released in September 1994 as the second single from the album Every Little Word.  The song reached #22 on the Billboard Hot Country Singles & Tracks chart.  The song was written by Ketchum and Al Anderson.

Chart performance

References

1994 singles
1994 songs
Hal Ketchum songs
Songs written by Al Anderson (NRBQ)
Songs written by Hal Ketchum
Song recordings produced by Allen Reynolds
Curb Records singles